Jens K. Sterri (13 July 1923 – 1 September 2008) was a Norwegian civil servant.

Born in Hafslo as the fourth of ten children, he decided to study law. He graduated from the University of Oslo as cand.jur. in 1949, and worked as a secretary in the Ministries of Justice and Agriculture, as well as an attorney. In 1954 he became a secretary in the Ministry of Finance, advancing to assistant secretary in 1961 and deputy under-secretary of State in 1969. He was appointed director of the Norwegian Customs and Excise Authorities in 1977, and retired in 1990.

The same year he was proclaimed Commander with Star of the Order of St. Olav. He was also a Commander of the Order of the Lion of Finland and a Knight of the Order of the Falcon. He died in September 2008 at the age of 85.

References

1923 births
2008 deaths
Directors of government agencies of Norway
Norwegian civil servants
Norwegian jurists
University of Oslo alumni
Knights of the Order of the Falcon
Commanders of the Order of the Lion of Finland